Charles Boyle, 3rd Earl of Cork and 2nd Earl of Burlington, 4th Baron Clifford, PC (died 9 February 1704) was an English peer, courtier and politician.

Early life
Hon. Charles Boyle was the eldest son of Charles Boyle, 3rd Viscount Dungarvan and his first wife, Lady Jane Seymour.

Career
In 1690, he became Member of Parliament for Appleby and also Governor of County Cork the following year. In 1694, he resigned his seat when he inherited his father's titles of Viscount Dungarvan, Baron Clifford and Baron Clifford of Lanesborough. In 1695, he was admitted to the Privy Council of Ireland and appointed Lord High Treasurer of Ireland. In 1698, he inherited his grandfather's titles of Earl of Burlington and Earl of Cork and was appointed a Lord of the Bedchamber that same year. In 1699, he was appointed Lord Lieutenant of the West Riding of Yorkshire and in 1702 admitted to the Privy Council of England.

He died in 1704 and his titles passed to his eldest son, Richard.

Personal life and death
On 26 January 1688, at Ely House, Charles Boyle married Juliana Noel (1672–1750), the only daughter and heiress of Hon. Henry Noel (himself the second son of Baptist Noel, 3rd Viscount Campden by his third wife, Hester Wotton).

They had five surviving children:

Lady Elizabeth Boyle (1690–1751), married Sir Henry Bedingfeld, 3rd Baronet.
Richard Boyle, 3rd Earl of Burlington (1694–1753)
Lady Juliana Boyle (c.1697–1739), married Charles Bruce, 3rd Earl of Ailesbury.
Lady Jane Boyle (1699–1780), died unmarried.
Lady Henrietta Boyle (1701–1746), married her distant cousin, Henry Boyle, 1st Earl of Shannon, in 1726.

The 2nd Earl of Burlington died on 9 February 1704. As Dowager Countess, his widow served as a Lady of the Bedchamber at the court of Queen Anne.

References

Bibliography 
 Murdoch, Tessa (ed.), Great Irish Households: Inventories from the Long Eighteenth Century. Cambridge: John Adamson, 2022  . See pp. 20–3 for a transcript of the inventory of his goods at Lismore Castle, Co. Waterford.

External link
http://thepeerage.com/p1250.htm#i12494

|-

|-

|-

|-

|-

|-

1704 deaths
02
03
Lord-Lieutenants of the West Riding of Yorkshire
Boyle, Charles
Members of the Privy Council of England
Members of the Privy Council of Ireland
Year of birth missing
Charles
Lord High Treasurers of Ireland
3rd